Eoghan Murphy (born 20 July 1987) is an Irish hurler who plays for Cork Senior Championship club Erin's Own. As of 2019, he plays as a full-forward. Murphy, along with his brother Kieran, is a former member of the Cork senior hurling team.

Playing career

University College Cork

As a student at University College Cork Murphy was selected for the college's senior hurling team on a number of occasions. On 7 March 2009, he was an unused substitute when UCC defeated the University of Limerick by 2-17 to 0-14 to win the Fitzgibbon Cup.

Erin's Own

Murphy joined the Erin's Own club at a young age and played in all grades at juvenile and underage levels, winning back-to-back Cork Under-21 Championship in 2004 and 2005. He made his first appearance for the club's senior team on 8 July 2005 in a 4-17 to 2-15 defeat of Imokilly.

On 22 October 2006, Murphy scored 1-10 from left corner-forward when Erin's Own defeated Cloyne by 2-19 to 3-14 in the final of the Cork Senior Championship. His tally of 1-31 placed him as the second-highest scorer in that year's championship.

On 14 October 2007, Murphy won a second Cork Senior Championship medal after Erin's Own 1-11 to 1-07 defeat of Newrownshandrum in the final. He scored five points from frees in the game.

Cork

Minor and under-21

Murphy was sixteen-years-old when he first played for Cork as a member of the minor team on 27 June 2004. He scored 1-01 after being introduced as a substitute in Cork's 2-12 to 3-08 defeat of Tipperary to win the Munster Championship.

On 26 June 2005, Murphy won a second Munster Championship medal after a 2-18 to 1-12 defeat of Limerick in the final.

Murphy subsequently progressed onto the Cork under-21 team. On 1 August 2008, he won a Munster Championship medal at full-forward after Cork's 1-20 to 0-10 defeat of Waterford in the final.

Senior

Murphy made his first appearance for the Cork senior hurling team on 18 February 2007 in a 1-21 to 0-14 National Hurling League defeat of Offaly. He scored from 1-01 during the game. Murphy was later included on Cork's championship panel and made his first appearance on 7 July in a 1-27 to 0-11 defeat of Offaly in the All-Ireland Qualifiers. Murphy's inter-county career ended at the end of the season.

Career statistics

Club

Inter-county

Honours

University College Cork
Fitzgibbon Cup (1): 2009

Erin's Own
Cork Senior Hurling Championship (2): 2006, 2007

Cork
Munster Under-21 Hurling Championship (1): 2007
Munster Minor Hurling Championship (2): 2004, 2005

References

External links
Eoghan Murphy profile at the Erin's Own GAA website

1987 births
Living people
Erin's Own (Cork) hurlers
UCC hurlers
Cork inter-county hurlers